The Ho-Am Prize in Engineering was established in 1994 by Kun-Hee Lee, the Chairman of Samsung, to honour the late chairman, Lee Byung-chul, the founder of the company. The Ho-Am Prize in Engineering is one of six prizes awarded annually, covering the five categories of Science, Engineering, Medicine, Arts, and Community Service, plus a Special Prize, which are named after the late chairman's sobriquet (art-name or pen name), Ho-Am.

The Ho-Am Prize in Engineering is presented each year, together with the other prizes, to individuals of Korean heritage who have furthered the welfare of humanity through distinguished accomplishments in the field of Engineering.

Prizewinners of Ho-Am Prize in Engineering
Source: Ho-Am Foundation

External links 
 Previous Laureates
 This Year Laureates

See also

 List of engineering awards
 Ho-Am Prize in Science
 Ho-Am Prize in the Arts
 Ho-Am Prize in Medicine
 Ho-Am Prize in Community Service

References

Engineering awards
Science and technology in South Korea
Awards established in 1994
Samsung
1994 establishments in South Korea